The School of Electronics, DAVV Indore (SOEx), is a department of Devi Ahilya Vishwavidyalaya in Indore, Madhya Pradesh, India. The department was founded as an autonomous institute in 1989 and is located on the Takshashila campus of the university.

History
The University Teaching Department of Electronics, called "School of Electronics", was conceived in 1989, with the launch of an M.Sc. (Electronics) four semester programme. The course was a joint initiative of UGC and the Department of Electronics, Government of India. The school started an M.Sc. (Electronics and Communication) course in 1993, an M. Tech (Embedded Systems) in 2002, an M. Tech (Spatial Information Technology) in 2007 and M. Tech (Mobile Computing Technology) in 2008.

Universities and colleges in Indore
Science and technology in Indore
Engineering colleges in Madhya Pradesh